Mountain View Farm, also known as Spencer Plantation and Mountain View Farm at Rebec Vineyards, is a historic home and farm located near Clifford, Amherst County, Virginia.  The property includes an 18th-century mansion, built about 1777, a 19th-century cottage and five other supporting buildings.  The main house is a standard timber frame, two-story, three bay, I-house with a rear ell addition.  It is sheathed in weatherboard with end chimneys. It was moved to its present site in 1831. The cottage is a one-room building with a lean-to shed addition. It was originally used as a doctor's office by Dr. Paul Carrington Cabell, and probably dates to the 1830s or 40s. Also on the property are the contributing well house, a playhouse (originally a chicken coop), a smokehouse, an ice house, carriage house, and a chicken coop. The property has been home to Rebec Vineyards since 1987.

It was added to the National Register of Historic Places in 1997.

References

External links
Rebec Vineyards website

Houses in Amherst County, Virginia
Houses completed in 1777
Colonial architecture in Virginia
Georgian architecture in Virginia
Houses on the National Register of Historic Places in Virginia
Farms on the National Register of Historic Places in Virginia
National Register of Historic Places in Amherst County, Virginia